Bob Wells may refer to:

 Bob Wells (baseball) (born 1966), former professional baseball player 
 Bob "Hoolihan" Wells (born 1933), former news/weather anchor and television personality
 Bob Wells (radio host) (active since 1999), Christian radio talk show host
 Bob Wells (American football) (1945–1994), American football player
 Bob Wells, manager of the minor league baseball team Springfield Midgets in 1928
 Bob Wells (vandweller) (born 1955/56), American author and participated in the movie Nomadland.

See also
 Robert Wells (disambiguation)